Fernand Crémieux (1857-1928) was a French lawyer and politician. He served as a member of the National Assembly from 1885 to 1889, and from 1893 to 1898, representing Gard. He also served as a member of the French Senate from 1903 to 1928, representing Gard.

References

1857 births
1928 deaths
Jewish French politicians
Radical Party (France) politicians
Members of the 4th Chamber of Deputies of the French Third Republic
Members of the 6th Chamber of Deputies of the French Third Republic
French Senators of the Third Republic
Senators of Gard
19th-century French lawyers
Chevaliers of the Légion d'honneur